Hirta is an island in Scotland.

Hirta may also refer to:

Places and jurisdictions  
 Hirta, Mesopotamia, a ruined Ancient city and former Assyrian bishopric, now near Najaf in Iraq and a Latin Catholic titular see

Biology - binomial species 
 C. hirta, including species of moth, shrew and fern
 H. hirta, including species of sea snail, flowering plant and grass
 R. hirta,  including various plant species